Aleksei Yuryevich Vasilyev (born 28 October 1987) is a former Russian professional footballer.

Club career
He made his professional debut in the Russian First Division in 2008 for FC Nosta Novotroitsk. He played two games for PFC CSKA Moscow main squad in the Russian Cup.

Honours
 Russian Cup winner: 2006.

References

1987 births
Living people
Russian footballers
Association football midfielders
PFC CSKA Moscow players
FC Dynamo Barnaul players
FC Sibir Novosibirsk players
Russian Premier League players
FC Torpedo Moscow players
FC SKA-Khabarovsk players
FC Ufa players
FC Sokol Saratov players
FC Olimp-Dolgoprudny players
FC Nosta Novotroitsk players